Senator Judge may refer to:

John Judge (politician) (born 1944), Iowa State Senate
Patty Judge (born 1943), Iowa State Senate
Thomas Lee Judge (1934–2006), Montana State Senate